Édouard Joseph Auguste Grinda (20 December 1866 – 28 March 1959) was a French politician best known for The Grinda Report written in 1923 and as architect of France's medical insurance law of 1928. He was born and died in Nice.

Jobs 
Minister of Work and Social Security from 13 December 1930 to 27 January 1931 in Théodore Steeg's government

Family 
His wife was Augustine Schmitz (d.1965). Their son was Jean-Paul Grinda, whose grandson is Thierry Roussel, the father of Athina Onassis Roussel.

His granddaughter, Hélène Grinda (b. 1944), had an illegitimate daughter with Prince Bernhard of Lippe-Biesterfeld, Alexia Grinda (b. 1967).

Bibliography 
He wrote Rapport fait au nom de la Commission d'Assurance et de Prévoyance Sociales chargée d'examiner le project de loi sur les assurances (in ). The report was published to the appendix of Procès-verbal'' of the meeting of January 31, no. 5505. Imprimerie de la Chambre, Paris, 1923.

References 

1866 births
1959 deaths
People from Nice
Politicians from Provence-Alpes-Côte d'Azur
Republican and Social Action politicians
Democratic Republican Alliance politicians
French Ministers of Labour and Social Affairs
Members of the 12th Chamber of Deputies of the French Third Republic
Members of the 13th Chamber of Deputies of the French Third Republic
Members of the 14th Chamber of Deputies of the French Third Republic